St Peter's College (officially The Anglican Church of Australia Collegiate School of Saint Peter, but commonly known as Saints) is an independent Anglican primary and secondary day and boarding school for boys located in Adelaide, South Australia, Australia. Founded in 1847 by members of the Anglican Church of Australia, the school is noted for its history and famous alumni, including three Nobel laureates, forty-two Rhodes scholars, ten South Australian Premiers, the 2019 Australian of the Year and the 2020 AFL Brownlow Medallist.

Three campuses are located on the Hackney Road site near the Adelaide Parklands in Hackney. The Senior School (Year 7-Year 12) comprises the bulk of the grounds and most of the historic buildings. To the south of the site are the Junior School (years 3-6) and Palm House (reception-Year 2). The college also owns an outdoor education campus in Finniss, near Lake Alexandrina. The school is a member of the G20 Schools group.

St Peter's College is a day and boarding school and offers two matriculation streams in secondary education: the South Australian Certificate of Education (SACE) and the International Baccalaureate Diploma (IB).

School performance

Academic
In 2021, St. Peter's College ranked equal 8th in South Australia and 358th nationally for academic achievement (including NAPLAN, ATAR, IBD). According to the Year 9 NAPLAN results in 2016, St. Peter's was above average in reading, writing, spelling and grammar and punctuation, and average for numeracy when compared to similar schools. When compared to all Australian schools it was substantially above average in reading, grammar and punctuation, and numeracy, while above average for writing and spelling. The school has 136 teaching staff and 132 non-teaching staff.

In 2010 The Age reported that St Peter's College ranked equal 7th among Australian schools based on the number of alumni who had received a top Order of Australia honour. In 2014 The Australian ranked the school third in South Australia based on overall NAPLAN results, behind girls' schools, Wilderness School and St Peter's Collegiate Girls' School. It was ranked 16th in Australia for boys' schools.

St Peter's College, working with Martin Seligman and Lea Waters, has been instrumental in the development and implementation of PESA's positive education programs throughout Australia. The former Headmaster, Simon Murray, was Chairman of the Positive Education Schools Association.

Demography
Of the 1383 students attending the school in 2016, 72% of students had parents in the top quarter of Australian society in socio-economic terms, while 1% came from the bottom quarter. 1% of students have indigenous heritage, while 8% have a non-English speaking background.

Financial
According to the Australian government's MySchool website, in 2015 St. Peter's recorded a net income of $34.5m, 64% of which came from student fees ($26k from each student), 12% from the Australian government and 20% from private sources.

History

The origins of the school lie in the ambition of the early colonists to establish for their sons an institution equivalent to the public schools from which they benefited in Great Britain. They founded the Church of England Collegiate School of South Australia, or "The Collegiate School", as a proprietary school on 15 July 1847 in the schoolroom of Trinity Church on North Terrace. The name Sancti Petri Schola Collegiata (SPSC) was given. The school's foundation was followed by the arrival of the first Bishop of Adelaide Augustus Short in December 1847. Short brought with him an endowment of £2,000 from the Society for Promoting Christian Knowledge with which he was expected establish an institution for the Church of England. He intended to use the Trinity School as the basis for this institution and had his chaplain T. P. Wilson appointed as its Head Master. He also purchased the school's current estate in Hackney. A similarly large endowment was contributed by William Allen, who through an early investment in the South Australian Mining Association had become wealthy.

In 1849, negotiations between Short and the proprietors concluded, and a Council of Governors was established as per their agreement. The school was rededicated as the Collegiate School of St Peter upon incorporation in July 1849. The Latin translation, Sancti Petri Schola Collegiata, is still used as the school acronym, SPSC, although it is often Anglicised to "St Peter's School Collegiate". Wilson, the first head master, resigned in 1851 after a dispute with the school's governors. The second master, S. P. R. Allom, acted in his place until Edmund Jenkins arrived in 1853.

The college moved to its present location in 1854, with 70 students, two habitable classrooms and two masters. The Ven. George Henry Farr (1819–1904) arrived from England in July of that year and served as head master 1854–1879.

List of headmasters

The following individuals have served as headmaster or any precedent title since the college's opening in 1847. The current headmaster is Tim Browning.

Emblem

The school's emblem consists of a blue shield with white trim, surmounted by two golden keys and bishop's mitre (contemporary versions place the mitre within rather than above the shield, dissimilating the emblem from that of the Diocese of Gloucester). The keys represent Saint Peter while the mitre represents the school's link to the Anglican Church. Beneath the shield is a scroll with the school's Latin motto "Pro Deo et Patria", which translates into English as "For God and Country".

House system
Upon entering the middle school in Year 7, all boys are assigned to a house. There are 10 houses, each named after prominent figures in the school's history. Four of these—Da Costa, Farrell, Hawkes and Short—were the original four houses founded in 1920. To accommodate the growing student population five additional houses were founded: MacDermott, Woodcock, Young, Howard and Farr. There is also a boarding house, School & Allen House, that was established in 2003 through the amalgamation of School House with Wyatt & Allen. Houses meet several times each week, and compete in various intra-school competitions throughout the year. Through sporting, academic, musical, fundraising and other competitions throughout the year, the houses compete for the Sir George Murray Shield.

Campus

Neighbouring suburbs College Park and St Peters were named after the school. The main campus' facilities include seven ovals, a hockey pitch, ten tennis courts and two swimming pools. It features mostly heritage architecture, such as "Palm House" (built for William Peacock), but also includes modern buildings. The "Big School Room" is thought to be Australia's oldest classroom still in constant use.

The most recent addition to the school has been the extensive redevelopment and extension of the Pentreath Building, featuring new technological state-of-the-art classrooms and wide open corridors with learning in mind. After redevelopment, it became the centre of the Middle Years program, which sees Year Sevens and Eights moving into the Senior School as regular students. The next most recent redevelopment is the Junior School, featuring new classrooms and lecture facilities as well as an observatory. In the Senior School, the Burchnall Sports Centre is also a recent development, which includes two basketball courts, a 25-metre pool, a diving pool, a strength and conditioning room, and café. The school is soon to commence construction of the 'Leadership and Ethics Centre' featuring lecture facilities, a new Year 12 common room and the school's museum.

The college also owns a large outdoor education property in Finniss, situated on several hectares of land on the banks of the River Finniss. The property includes dormitories, teacher accommodation and a gymnasium, and students are involved with the property's revegetation program of native flora. The property's location on the banks of the River Finniss makes it an ideal location for the school's Rowing and Sailing camps.

 
A significant source of the school's revenue is the estate of Benjamin Mendes da Costa. Da Costa, a successful Adelaide businessman, died in 1868 and bequeathed to the school an estate of £20,000 (over £2,200,000 in 2020 GBP). The bequest was subject to the life interests of ten relations; the last surviving relation died in 1910 and in 1912 the property was vested in the school. A large portion of the estate remains land in prominent city-centre locations. Income generated by the estate is used to subsidise the fees of all students, along with several scholarships and bursaries. The College sold one of its properties, Da Costa Arcade, near Rundle Mall, in 2005.

A somewhat common Adelaidean urban myth asserts that the Da Costa estate was intended to be given to the Catholic church rather than the Anglican, and that the funds were awarded to Saints after a supposed legal battle. This myth has no basis in fact and most probably stems from misconceptions of da Costa's religion due to his Portuguese family name.

Extracurricular activities

Sport

St Peter's College is a member of the Sports Association for Adelaide Schools (SAAS). Each student at St Peter's is required to play both a summer and winter sport.

Staff and past students conduct training sessions. Weekend competitions are held at the school (or at away venues) each weekend against other schools in Adelaide. Many sports have an annual intercollegiate showdown against rivals Prince Alfred College, known as the "Intercol". Some intercol events include the head of the river, football showdown, water polo, and basketball. The cricket intercol is the oldest continuous cricket match in the world, having been played annually since 1878.

Music
The school runs an extensive music program which encourages students to study musical instruments and perform in ensembles. These ensembles perform in several concerts throughout the year, both within the school and externally. Groups include a middle-school, intermediate and senior concert band, senior choir, orchestra, string orchestra, Dixieland band, and three big bands with the senior two formerly named after prominent Australian jazz musicians James Morrison and Don Burrows.

In 2018, the music department was moved to the former Languages Centre, next to the Burchnall Sports Centre. This new facility included sound-proofed practice rooms, large rehearsal spaces, and will include a recording studio.

Outdoor education
The Outdoor Education campus at Finniss is used by students from years 4 to 10 for annual camps, with camps culminating in Year 10 with the 21-day Peak Experience in the Flinders Ranges. In addition, students have the opportunity to join the Exploration Society, which allows boys with a passion for outdoor activities to pursue more challenging ventures. Activities include hiking, kayaking, rock-climbing, mountain bike touring and cross country skiing.

Exchange program
St Peter's College's exchange program has links with schools in Germany, France, China, South Africa, England, Switzerland, Mexico and Canada.

Notable alumni

See also

 List of schools in South Australia
 List of Anglican schools in Australia
 List of boarding schools in Australia

Notes

References

External links
 

Educational institutions established in 1847
Boarding schools in South Australia
Member schools of the Headmasters' and Headmistresses' Conference
Anglican secondary schools in Adelaide
Boys' schools in South Australia
Junior School Heads Association of Australia Member Schools
Anglican primary schools in Adelaide
International Baccalaureate schools in Australia
History of education in Australia
1847 establishments in Australia
History of Adelaide